Pakistan Atomic Energy Commission (PAEC) is a federally funded independent governmental agency, concerned with research and development of nuclear power, promotion of nuclear science, energy conservation and the peaceful usage of nuclear technology.

Since its establishment in 1956, the PAEC has overseen the extensive development of nuclear infrastructure to support the economical uplift of Pakistan by founding institutions that focus on development on food irradiation and on nuclear medicine radiation therapy for cancer treatment. The PAEC organizes conferences and directs research at the country's leading universities.
Since the 1960s, the PAEC is also a scientific research partner and sponsor of the European Organization for Nuclear Research (CERN), where Pakistani scientists have contributed to developing particle accelerators and research on high-energy physics. PAEC scientists regularly pay visits to CERN while taking part in projects led by CERN.

Until 2001, the PAEC was the civilian federal oversight agency that manifested the control of atomic radiation, development of nuclear weapons, and their testing. These functions were eventually taken over by the Nuclear Regulatory Authority (NRA), and the National Command Authority under the Prime Minister of Pakistan.

Overview

Early history

Following the partition of the British Indian Empire by the United Kingdom in 1947, Pakistan emerged as a Muslim-dominated state. The turbulent nature of its emergence critically influenced the scientific development of Pakistan.

The establishment of the Council of Scientific and Industrial Research (PCSIR) in 1951 began Pakistan's research on physical sciences.  In 1953, U.S. President Dwight Eisenhower announced the Atoms for Peace program, of which Pakistan became its earliest partner. Research at PAEC initially followed a strict non-weapon policy issued by then-Foreign Minister Sir Zafarullah Khan. In 1955, the Government of Pakistan established a committee of scientists to prepare nuclear energy plans and build an industrial nuclear infrastructure throughout the country. As the Energy Council Act went into full effect, Prime Minister Huseyn Suhrawardy established the Pakistan Atomic Energy Commission (PAEC) in March 1956.  Its first chair was Nazir Ahmad – an experimental physicist. Other members of the PAEC included Technical member Salimuzzaman Siddiqui, an organic chemist at the University of Karachi, and Raziuddin Siddiqui, a mathematical physicist at the same university.  Together, they both took charge of the research and development directorates of the commission. In 1958, Abdus Salam of the University of the Punjab also joined the commission, along with Munir Ahmad Khan who initially lobbied for acquiring an open pool reactor from the United States.

In 1958, PAEC Chairman Nazir Ahmad proposed to the Pakistan Industrial Development Corporation the building of a heavy water production facility with the capacity to produce 50 kg of heavy water per day at Multan, but this proposal was not acted on.  In 1960, I. H. Usmani was elevated as PAEC's second chair with the transfer of Nazir Ahmad at the Federal Bureau of Statistics. The Multan Heavy Water Production Facility reactor was built in 1962, financed by local fertilizer companies. In 1964, PAEC established its first research institute, the Pakistan Institute of Nuclear Science and Technology (PINSTECH), at Nilore, and began negotiation for Pakistan's first commercial nuclear power plant to be built in Karachi. In 1965, the PAEC reached an agreement with Canadian General Electric to build a CANDU reactor in Karachi. Financial investment for the Karachi Nuclear Power Plant was provided by the Economic Coordination Committee, and Edward Durell Stone was commissioned to oversee the architectural design of PINSTECH. From 1965–71, the PAEC sent 600 scientists abroad for training in nuclear sciences. in 1969, the United Kingdom Atomic Energy Authority, agreed to supply a small scale nuclear reprocessing plant, with the capacity to extract 360 grams of plutonium per year. In 1973, the PAEC announced the discovery of large uranium deposits in Punjab.

After India's decisive victory in the Indo-Pakistani War of 1971, Pakistan retracted its non-weapon policy and the research and development of nuclear weapons began in 1972. PAEC's senior nuclear engineer Munir Ahmad Khan, was named as PAEC's third chair by Prime Minister Zulfikar Ali Bhutto. Work began on  development of the nuclear fuel cycle infrastructure, and nuclear weapons research in the 1970s. Key research took place at PINSTECH, where scientists worked on weapon designs and eventual nuclear weapons testing.  The PAEC expanded the crash program with various laboratories, facilities, and directorates researching on developing and testing materials and components for bomb designs, whilst it engineered plants and funded facilities for production of highly enriched uranium (HEU) and plutonium.  In 1976, possible test sites were decided by the PAEC and construction on the sites was completed in 1979. In 1983, PAEC's efforts reached a milestone when it conducted its first subcritical test on a weapon design; such testing continued until the early 1990s under codename: Kirana-I.

Following nuclear tests by India earlier in the month, on 28 May 1998, PAEC led the final preparations and conducted Pakistan's first nuclear tests (Codename: Chagai-I), which was followed by Chagai-II in Kharan Desert on 30 May 1998. In 2001, the PAEC's research was focused back onto civilian and peaceful research with the establishment of the National Command Authority and the Pakistan Nuclear Regulatory Authority.

Research and education

Since its establishment in 1956, the PAEC has provided a conspicuous example of the benefits of atomic age technologies for the advancement of agriculture, engineering, biology, and medicine. In 1960, the PAEC established its first nuclear medicine centre for cancer treatment at the Jinnah Medical College of the University of Karachi; the second Medical Isotope Institute was established at the Mayo Hospital of the King Edward Medical University, Lahore. Physicians and medical researchers were provided with facilities for cancer diagnosis and treatment by the PAEC's funding.

In 1960, the PAEC established its regional atomic research centre in Lahore, and a metallurgy centre in Karachi in 1963. Another energy centre was located in Dhaka where many scientists were educated. In 1967, the PAEC founded the Institute of Engineering and Applied Sciences which became one of the primary technical universities of the country. Many of the PAEC's scientists and engineers served in its faculty. The PAEC supports its university-level physics program at the Government College University, Lahore where it awards fellowships to the students. The PAEC continues to promotes its program as "peaceful uses of atomic energy commenced for the benefit the scientific community as well as public."

About its promotion of education, senior scientist, Ishfaq Ahmad quoted: "the PAEC was responsible to send more than 600 scientists to the abroad. As of present, PAEC maintains its prestigious image, and is now noted as one of the largest science and technology institution of the country. The PAEC supports research activities and learning programs at the International Centre for Theoretical Physics (ICTP), of which PAEC is also its organizer. Since 1974, the PAEC has been a key organizer and sponsor of the International Nathiagali Summer College on Physics and Contemporary Needs conference each year where scientists from all over the world are delegated to the country. The Summer College disseminates the knowledge of advancements in physics, chemistry, biology, astronomy, mathematics, computer science, logic, and philosophy.

As the emphasis shifted towards concerns for national security interests, the PAEC's important projects were also initiated in this area. Many notable scientists with international prestige have worked and affiliated with the PAEC.

Studies on expansion of nuclear power

PAEC is held responsible for design preparation and proper operational function of Pakistan's commercial nuclear power plants. The PAEC provides lobbying at the governmental level for the safe usage of nuclear power sources; though the nuclear safety regulations, Protection of the nuclear power facilities is managed by the Pakistan Nuclear Regulatory Authority (PNRA). Providing policy guidance to the government, PAEC's studies envision setting up power plants with a capacity of approximately 8800 Megawatts by 2030.

Under this policy, the KANUPP power plants and CHASHNUPP power plants are expanding and under construction as of 2013.

Constituent institutions

 Nuclear Institute for Food and Agriculture
 Nuclear Institute for Agriculture and Biology
 National Institute for Biotechnology and Genetic Engineering
 National Agricultural Research Centre
 Institute of Nuclear Medicine, Oncology and Radiotherapy
 National Centre for Physics
 National Institute of Lasers and Optronics (NILOP)
 Pakistan Institute of Engineering and Applied Sciences (PIEAS)
 Center for Nuclear Medicine and Radiotherapy (CENAR)
 Nuclear Medicine, Oncology and Radiotherapy Institute (NORI)

PAEC partnership with CERN
Pakistan has a long history of participating in experiments and research undertakings with CERN, and has a long tradition of  physicists who are working around the world. Since the 1960s, Pakistan has been contributing and regularly participating in CERN's projects, theoretical and nuclear experiments.  A prime example would be Abdus Salam; Salam was the first man to be accredited with all the collaboration with CERN which when he convinced them to give Pakistan stacks of nuclear emulsions exposed for further study of pions, kaons and antiprotons in the 1960s. Some theoretical physicists from Pakistan had the opportunity to work at CERN through short visits. During the 1980s, some of the experimental physicists from Pakistan, specialising in the technique of Solid State Nuclear Track Detectors (SSNTD), also benefited from CERN by exposing the stacks in the beam at the Super Proton Synchrotron (SPS).

In 2005, CERN awarded PAEC with the ATLAS Supplier Award in 2005, in connection with manufacturing and fabrication of various equipment for CERN.

On 27 June 2011, PAEC and CERN reached an agreement for extending the technical cooperation with CERN's upcoming programmes. CERN's Director-General Rolf-Dieter Heuer personally paid a visit to Pakistan where he spoke of the importance of science in Pakistan, and the importance of Germany's strategic alliance with Pakistan. The agreement was signed in order to extend an earlier agreement, which came into operation in 2003 between CERN and Pakistan for the supply of manufactured equipment for the Large Hadron Collider (LHC) at CERN, along with placement of scientists and engineers from Pakistan to assist in the scientific programme at CERN.

With the efforts led by the PAEC, CERN made Pakistan an associate member, on 22 June 2014— the first Asian country and the second Muslim country after Turkey.

PAEC contribution to Compact Muon Solenoid
In 1997 PAEC chairman Ishfaq Ahmad reached out to CERN to sign a contract between them after elaborate discussions an in-kind contribution worth one million Swiss francs for the construction of eight magnet supports for the Compact Muon Solenoid (CMS) detector.

For the CMS, the PAEC built magnetic feet and installed 320 Resistive Plate Chambers (RPC), as well as contributing to CMS computing. Several other mechanical components for ATLAS and for the LHC were also built by the PAEC. It was PAEC's efforts that led the Pakistan Institute of Nuclear Science and Technology (PINSTECH) with CERN's direct cooperation in the area of radioprotection.

PAEC support to Large Hadron Collider

In 2000, CERN signed another agreement which doubled the Pakistani contribution from one to two million Swiss francs. And with this new agreement Pakistan started construction of the resistive plate chambers required for the CMS muon system. While more recently, a protocol has been signed enhancing Pakistan's total contribution to the LHC programme to $10 million. Pakistan with all these efforts is already hoping to become an observer state at CERN.  In 2006 PAEC and CERN agreed on expanded cooperation, including contributions by PAEC valued at 5 million Swiss francs.

World's largest particle accelerator at CERN

The PAEC, partnered with Pakistan's leading universities, sent a large team of scientists and engineers to CERN to participate in the Large Hadron Collider on 10 September 2008. According to the news sources, the team of Pakistani scientists were keenly involved in the development of the Large Hadron Collider— the world's largest and highest-energy particle accelerator.

The data of the experiment was available for the Pakistani scientists who would examine the data and results would be accumulated afterwards by them.

PAEC chairs

Awards 
On June 26, 2021, 4 scientists of the PAEC were awarded the Team Achievement Award and another scientist was awarded the Young Scientist Award for work in plant mutation breeding and related technologies. These awards were bestowed in recognition of Pakistan's advancements in the application of nuclear technology for achieving the U.N. Sustainable Development Goals. The awards were jointly awarded by the International Atomic Energy Agency (IAEA) and the U.N.'s Food and Agriculture Organization.

Corporate management
The PAEC is chaired by the person appointed by the Government of Pakistan as the governmental notification is released. The PAEC's corporate management is organized by the Government of Pakistan who awarded contracts to the potential candidates. Its full-time members consist of the appointed Chair; a finance member; and two technical members. Its part-time members are composed of the senior scientists and a chief scientific adviser to the government.

Full Time Ex-officios
 Chairman— Chair (or CEO) of the PAEC.
 Finance Member— A civil servant from the Ministry of Finance (MoF).
Technical members— one from Pakistan Engineering Council (PEC) and one from Pakistan Administrative Service.
Disaster Recovery members— one from PMS and one from Pakistan Institute of Medical Sciences.
Part-Time Ex-officios
Senior scientist— A scientist in the services of the Ministry of Science (MoST).
Senior Engineer—An engineer in the services of the Government of Pakistan.
Science Adviser to the Government of Pakistan.

The PAEC's corporate team are constitutionally bound to meet not less than four times every year for the execution of development projects involving nuclear power stations and the generation of electric power. Muhammad Naeem is the current chairman of the PAEC, appointed to the office since 2015. The PAEC retains its autonomous corporate management and comes under the structure of the National Command Authority. The amendments carried out in 2010, the National Command Authority is now placed again under the Prime Minister of Pakistan. The Chairman directly reports to the Prime Minister's Secretariat for its policy making and confirmation issues.

See also

 Pakistan and weapons of mass destruction
 Science and technology in Pakistan
 Pakistan Institute of Nuclear Science and Technology (PINSTECH)
 Space and Upper Atmosphere Research Commission (SUPARCO)

References

External links
Official website
Pakistan's contribution to the Large Hadron Collider (LHC)

 
Nuclear power in Pakistan
Nuclear technology in Pakistan
Pakistan federal departments and agencies
Science and technology in Pakistan
Project-706
Nuclear weapons programme of Pakistan
Nuclear organizations
Governmental nuclear organizations
1956 establishments in Pakistan
Government agencies established in 1956
Institutes associated with CERN